J. M. Raju is an Indian film singer and music composer in Malayalam cinema during the 1970s. He made his debut with the movie Naadan Pennu in 1967.

Personal life
He is married to Latha Raju, a Malayalam playback singer, who is the daughter of famous singers Santha P. Nair and K. Padmanabhan Nair. The couple have two children, Aalap Raju and Anupama. Aalap Raju is also a playback singer. In 2015 Raju has won the Kalashree Award from the Kerala Sangeeta Nataka Academy.

Filmography

As a music composer
 Nadi Nadi ...	Chevalier Michael	1992	
 Bhaagyam vannu ...	Chevalier Michael	1992	
 Vaanil Vibhaatham ...	Chevalier Michael	1992	
 Kaathirunna Raavu ...	Chevalier Michael	1992	
 Kannaadikkaavilile ...	Chevalier Michael	1992	
 Navayuva Midhunam ...	Keralam Manoharam	1999	
 Anuraagame ...	Keralam Manoharam	1999
 Prasada Sindooram ...	Keralam Manoharam	1999	
 Paalaruvi Neeyenikku Thozhi ...	Keralam Manoharam	1999

As a playback singer
 Naadan Premam ...	Naadan Pennu	1967	
 Paalkadal Naduvil ...	Kanaatha Veshangal	1967	
 Raathri Raathri ...	Ezhu Raathrikal	1968	
 Pottithakarnna ...	Baalya Prathijna (Purusharathnam)	1972	
 Marathakappattudutha Vilaasini ...	Baalya Prathijna (Purusharathnam)	1972	
 Kala kala mozhi ...	Premageethangal	1981	
 Ilam Manjil ...	Adharangal Vithumpunnu	1981	
 Ambili Manavatti azhakulla manavaatti ...	Ee Naadu	1982	
 Thattedi Sosamme ...	Ee Naadu	1982	
 Aakaasha perunthachan ...	Ee Naadu	1982	
 Iru Meyyaanennaalum [Bit] ...	Ee Naadu	1982	
 Amme mahaamaaye ...	Jambulingam	1982	
 Amme Kanyaamariyame (Chilluvazhi Paayum) ...	Idavela	1982	
 Gloria Gloria Gloria Swargeeya (Vinnin Saanthi Sandesham) ...	Idavela	1982	
 Ente kadha ninte kadha ...	Ithu Njangalude Kadha	1982	
 Thathammappenninu kalyaanam ...	Thuranna Jail	1982	
 Swarga Vaathil Thurannu Thannu ...	Iniyenkilum	1983	
 Ilam Manjil [Adharangal Vithumbunnu] ...	Kaathirunna Divasam	1983	
 Poonkili painkili ...	Kolakkomban	1983	
 Odi odi odi vannu ...	Swanthamevide Bandhamevide	1984	
 Illillam Poo ...	Akalangalil	1986	
 Bhaagyam vannu ...	Chevalier Michael	1992

References

External links

Malayalam playback singers
Singers from Kochi
Indian male playback singers
20th-century Indian male classical singers
Film musicians from Kerala
Male Carnatic singers
Carnatic singers
20th-century Indian composers